Melodies for You was a long-running BBC radio music programme, broadcast on Sunday mornings until 1992 and Sunday evenings subsequently, which presented works of light popular and classical music.

The show was merged with Your Hundred Best Tunes in 2007 by BBC controller Lesley Douglas, who appointed Alan Titchmarsh as presenter. The show was then dropped by controller Bob Shennan with the final broadcast on Sunday, 28 August 2011.

In the final broadcast, Alan Titchmarsh played personal favourites:

 Gilbert Vinter and his Orchestra — The Arcadians Overture
 Edita Gruberová — Der Holle Rache
 Black Dyke Mills Band — The Titchmarsh Warbler
 The New London Orchestra — Knightsbridge March
 Iona Brown — The Lark Ascending
 Jussi Bjoerling and Robert Merrill — Pearl Fishers Duet
 Peter Skellern and Richard Stilgoe — Joyce the Librarian
 The Band of Her Majesty's Royal Marines — Sunset
 New Symphony Orchestra of London — The Nightmare Song from Isidore
 Pat Metheny — Always and Forever
 Thomas Round — Love Unspoken from The Merry Widow
 BBC Concert Orchestra — Leap Year Waltz
 Philharmonia Orchestra — Rose Adagio
 Joyce Grenfell — Old Tyme Dancing
 Manchester Children's Choir — Nymphs and Shepherds from The Libertine
 Royal Philharmonic Orchestra - Pride and Prejudice
 Shirley Jones and Gordon Macrae — If I Loved You
 Huddersfield Choral Society and Orchestra — Hallelujah Chorus

References

External links

BBC Radio 2 programmes
British classical music radio programmes
1967 establishments in the United Kingdom
2011 disestablishments in the United Kingdom